Frogger Returns is a game for the PlayStation 3 and Wii by American developer Hijinx Studios. This game is purchased from the PlayStation Store, and it was available on the Wii Shop Channel before the service ended. The game was also released as DSiWare in North America on May 18, 2010.

Gameplay
The game has four levels: Big City, Subway, Sewers, and Swamp. By collecting power-ups, the player gains the ability to stop and reverse time and make themselves invincible for a short period, among other effects. In the Wii and PlayStation versions, there is a multi-player mode with many different mini-games.

Development
On October 27, 2009, Konami announced Frogger Returns was to be released on WiiWare and PlayStation Network. A DSiWare version was announced in 2010.

Reception

Frogger Returns received negative reviews from critics upon release. On Metacritic, the game holds scores of 44/100 for the PlayStation 3 version based on 5 reviews, and 47/100 for the Wii version based on 5 reviews.

IGN gave the game a 4.6/10 stating that it is "ugly, forces the player to use a batcrap crazy control scheme, a bad camera angle results in cheap deaths, and it can't go online".

References

2009 video games
Frogger
PlayStation 3 games
PlayStation Network games
PlayStation Portable games
WiiWare games
DSiWare games
Video games developed in the United States
Multiplayer and single-player video games